William Sewell may refer to:

 William H. Sewell (1909–2001), United States sociologist
 William H. Sewell Jr. (born 1940), American academic
 William Joyce Sewell (1835–1901), Union Army officer and Senator from New Jersey
 William Sewell (author) (1804–1874), English divine and author
 William Sewell (cricketer) (died 1862), English cricketer
 William Sewell (poet) (1951–2003), New Zealand poet
 William Sewell (trade unionist) (1852–1948), British trade unionist
 William Sewell (veterinary surgeon) (1781–1853), principal of the London Veterinary College
 William Arthur Sewell (1903–1972), university professor of English
 William Elbridge Sewell (1851–1904), United States Navy officer
 William Henry Sewell (died 1862), British Army officer

See also
 Bill Sewell (disambiguation)